Jonathan Govett (born 22 June 1969) is a retired English cricket player. He was a right-handed batsman and right-arm medium-fast bowler  who played for Berkshire.

Personal life
He was born in St Germans, a small village in southwesternEngland on 22 June 1969.

Playing career
Govett debuted in the Minor Counties Championship in 1995, four seasons after appearing for the only time in the Bain Clarkson Trophy in 1991. Govett made a single List A appearance, during the 1996 season, against Leicestershire. Berkshire lost the match, mainly thanks to a double century from England international Vince Wells.

References

External links
Jonathan Govett at Cricket Archive

1969 births
Living people
English cricketers
Berkshire cricketers
People from St Germans, Cornwall